Question 4 was a voter referendum to amend the Constitution of Maryland in order to legalize cannabis for adult use in Maryland. The referendum was approved overwhelmingly, with more than twice as many voters voting in favor of it than against it, on November 8, 2022, and will go into effect on July 1, 2023.

History
On July 16, 2021, the speaker of the state House of Delegates, Adrienne A. Jones, created a committee to draft a referendum on legalization to place before voters in 2022. Around December 25, the chairman of the state House Cannabis Referendum and Legalization Workgroup, Luke Clippinger, pre-filed House Bill 1 for the 2022 session, to initiate the citizen referendum in 2022 that would create a constitutional amendment to legalize cannabis. The referendum bill and accompanying bill implementing legalization, House Bill 837 received public testimony and were discussed by the House Judiciary Committee on February 14, 2022. House Bill 1 was passed by the house 96–34 on February 25. This bill was contingent on passage of the ballot referendum in the November 2022 election, whereby it would legalize recreational use of cannabis possession and use on or after July 1, 2023. The constitutional referendum and the legalization bill were both passed by the Maryland Senate on April 1.
Senate Finance Committee hearings on the bills began on March 23. 

Voters approved the referendum on November 8, 2022 with around 65% of voters in favor. It will fully take effect on July 1, 2023.

Provisions
This bill would also establish a Cannabis Business Assistance Fund to support equity initiatives for minority- and women-owned businesses. That fund would go toward incubator and educational programs to promote participation in the industry by people most impacted by criminalization. The bill would also automatically expunge prior criminal convictions for conduct made legal under the proposed law.

Between January 1 and July 1, 2023, possession of up to 1.5 ounces will be a civil infraction subject to $100 fine, as provided by House Bill 837.

Opinion polls
On Question 4

On whether recreational marijuana should be legal

Results

Source: Maryland State Board of Elections

See also
2022 Maryland elections
Cannabis in Maryland
List of 2022 United States cannabis reform proposals

Notes

Partisan clients

References

External links

Maryland House Bill 1 at Legiscan

2022 cannabis law reform
Cannabis ballot measures in the United States
Cannabis in Maryland